, also known as , is a Japanese organizing consultant, author, and TV presenter.

Kondo has written four books on organizing, which have collectively sold millions of copies around the world. Her books have been translated from Japanese into several languages and her book The Life-Changing Magic of Tidying Up (2011) has been published in more than 30 countries. It was a best-seller in Japan and in Europe, and was published in the United States in 2014.

In the United States and the United Kingdom, the profile of Kondo and her methods were greatly promoted by the success of the Netflix series Tidying Up with Marie Kondo, released in 2019, which gained Kondo a nomination for the Primetime Emmy Award for Outstanding Host for a Reality or Competition Program. In August 2021, Netflix released a follow-up show, Sparking Joy with Marie Kondo.
She was listed as one of Time "100 most influential people" in 2015.

Kondo opened an online store called KonMari in 2019.

Background

Kondo says that she has been interested in organizing since childhood. In junior school, Kondo ran into the classroom to tidy up bookshelves while her classmates were playing in physical education class. Whenever there were nominations for class roles, she did not seek to be the class representative or the pet feeder. Instead, she yearned to be the bookshelf manager to continue to tidy up books. She said she experienced a breakthrough in organizing one day: "I was obsessed with what I could throw away. One day, I had a kind of nervous breakdown and fainted. I was unconscious for two hours. When I came to, I heard a mysterious voice, like some god of tidying telling me to look at my things more closely. And I realized my mistake: I was only looking for things to throw out. What I should be doing is finding the things I want to keep. Identifying the things that make you happy: that is the work of tidying."

She spent five years as an attendant maiden at a Shinto shrine. She founded her organising consulting business when she was 19 and a sociology student at Tokyo Woman's Christian University. In her senior year, she wrote her capstone thesis, titled "Tidying up as seen from the perspective of gender".

KonMari method
Kondo's method of organizing is known as the KonMari method, and consists of gathering together all of one's belongings, one category at a time, and then keeping only those things that "spark joy" (Japanese language ときめく tokimeku, translated as equivalent to English "flutter, throb, palpitate"), and choosing a place for everything from then on. Kondo advises to start the process of tidying up by "quickly and completely" discarding whatever it is in the house that doesn't spark joy. Following this philosophy will acknowledge the usefulness of each belonging and help owners learn more about themselves, which will help them be able to more easily decide what to keep or discard. She advises to do this by category of items and not their location in the house. For example, all the clothes in the house should be piled up first, assessed for tokimeku, and discarded if not needed, followed by other categories such as books, papers, miscellany, and mementos. Another crucial aspect of the KonMari method is to find a designated place for each item in the house and making sure it stays there. 

Kondo says that her method is partly-inspired by the Shinto religion. Cleaning and organizing things properly can be a spiritual practice in Shintoism, which is concerned with the energy or divine spirit of things (kami) and the right way to live (kannagara): Treasuring what you have; treating the objects you own as not disposable, but valuable, no matter their actual monetary worth; and creating displays so you can value each individual object are all essentially Shinto ways of living.As of 2023, Kondo says she has "kind of given up" on the KonMari method after giving birth to her third child:My home is messy, but the way I am spending my time is the right way for me at this time at this stage of my life.

Media appearances
A two-part TV dramatisation was filmed in 2013 based on Kondo and her work, titled . She has lectured and made television appearances. She released a series of videos teaching "the best way to fold for perfect appearance".

On 1 January 2019, Netflix released a series called Tidying Up with Marie Kondo. In the series, Kondo visits various American family homes full of clutter and guides the families in tidying up their houses through her KonMari method. Following the release of her Netflix series, Kondo was the subject of various Internet memes. A clip of her saying "I love mess" included on Times list of the ten best memes of 2019.

On 4 February 2019, Kondo appeared on The Late Show with Stephen Colbert on CBS.

In August 2021, Kondo followed up Tidying Up with Marie Kondo with a similar series for Netflix titled Sparking Joy with Marie Kondo.

Personal life
Kondo married Kawahara Takumi in 2012. At the time they met, Kawahara was working in sales-support and marketing at a corporation in Osaka. Once Kondo's career was established, he left his job to become her manager and, eventually, CEO of Konmari-Media, LLC. The couple has two daughters and a son. 

After getting married, they lived in Tokyo, but later moved to San Francisco, and as of 2022, Kondo and her family live in Los Angeles, California. Kondo's rigorous attitude towards tidying her home relaxed after the birth of her third child in order to make room for more personal priorities at this stage of her life.

Publications
Jinsei ga Tokimeku Katazuke no Mahō (人生がときめく片づけの魔法). Tokyo: Sunmark Shuppan, 2011;  
English translation. The life-changing Magic of Tidying up: The Japanese Art of Decluttering and Organizing. New York: Ten Speed Press, 2014; .
Jinsei ga Tokimeku Katazuke no Mahō 2 (人生がときめく片づけの魔法2). Tokyo: Sunmark Shuppan, 2012; .
Mainichi ga Tokimeku Katazuke no Mahō (毎日がときめく片付けの魔法), Tokyo: Sunmark Shuppan, 2014; .
Irasuto de Tokimeku Katazuke no Mahō = The Illustrated Guide to the Life-Changing Magic of Tidying Up (イラストでときめく片付けの魔法）. Tokyo: Sunmark Shuppan, 2015; .
Manga de Yomu Jinsei ga Tokimeku Katazuke no Mahō. Tokyo: Sunmark Publishing, 2017;
English translation. The Life-Changing Manga of Tidying Up: a magical story. New York: Ten Speed Press, 2017; .

References

External links

 
 
 

1984 births
21st-century Japanese writers
American television personalities
American women television personalities
Cleaning
Internet memes introduced in 2019
Japanese non-fiction writers
Japanese Shintoists
Japanese television personalities
Japanese women writers
Living people
Ordering
Tokyo Woman's Christian University alumni
Writers from Tokyo
Shorty Award winners
Japanese expatriates in the United States